Tsiu Monne (born 22 June 1962) is a Lesotho boxer. He competed in the men's middleweight event at the 1984 Summer Olympics.

References

1962 births
Living people
Lesotho male boxers
Olympic boxers of Lesotho
Boxers at the 1984 Summer Olympics
Place of birth missing (living people)
Middleweight boxers